The 2018–19 season was FC Ararat Yerevan's 28th consecutive season in Armenian Premier League. They finished the season in ninth and last place, in the Armenian Premier League whilst being knocked out of the Armenian Cup by Banants in the Second Round.

Season events
On 30 July, Armen Stepanyan was appointed as Ararat Yerevan's new Head Coach.

On 4 August, Ararat announced the singings of Zaven Badoyan, Alan Tatayev, Roni and Dmitri Malyaka, whilst Arman Meliksetyan, Argishti Petrosyan and Gegham Tumbaryan were all released by mutual consent.

Squad

Transfers

In

Loans in

Released

Competitions

Armenian Premier League

Results

Table

Armenian Cup

Statistics

Appearances and goals

|-
|colspan="16"|Players who left Ararat Yerevan during the season:

|}

Goal scorers

Clean sheets

Disciplinary Record

References

FC Ararat Yerevan seasons
Ararat Yerevan